Martha Bratton (née Robertson/Robinson c. 1749/50 – 1816) was an American patriot during the Revolutionary War.

Martha was married to Colonel William Bratton. While he was serving in the American forces, he left a large supply of gunpowder at their home in South Carolina. The British were informed about the presence of this cache and moved to seize the supplies. As there was insufficient time to evacuate the material, Martha instead blew it up, timing the explosion to coincide with the arrival of the British troops. Confronted with threats of harsh punishment, she told the British: "Let the consequence be what it will, I glory in having prevented the mischief contemplated by the cruel enemies of my country".

On another occasion, the British questioned Martha as to her husband's location. She refused to reveal his position, even as a British soldier held a reaping hook at her throat. That night, through a family slave, Watt, she sent a message to her husband about where the British were staying, prompting a surprise attack by the patriots. The battlefield included her home; she put her son in the chimney to prevent him from being injured by stray gunfire. The victorious patriots housed a number of captured British soldiers in the Bratton home.

After Martha's death in 1816, her son inherited her home and later converted it into a school for girls.

At an anniversary celebration in Brattonsville, South Carolina (named after the couple) in 1839, a toast was dedicated to the memory of Martha Bratton, praising her as "so faithful a wife, so firm a friend to liberty!"

See also
Huck's Defeat

References

Women in the American Revolution
1740s births
1816 deaths
People from Williamsburg County, South Carolina
People of South Carolina in the American Revolution